ReNew is India's largest renewable energy company by operational capacity. Based in Gurgaon, Haryana, it has an asset base of over 10 GW, with around 5 GW operational. ReNew Power operates over 110 projects across 18 states in India, developing, building, owning and operating utility-scale wind and solar energy projects, including distributed solar energy production for commercial and industrial consumers.

The company rebranded itself as Renew in February 2023, as per an announcement carried on Nasdaq.

History 
Sumant Sinha started ReNew Power in 2011 and Goldman Sachs invested that September. The company began its first project at Jasdan in Gujarat in May 2012. In 2016, ReNew became the first renewable energy IPP to raise rupee-denominated masala bonds and the same year became the first Indian renewable energy company to achieve 1 GW capacity.

In 2016, ReNew Power launched an IIT centre of excellence to collaborate with the institution in research and technology development.

In 2017 JERA (a joint venture between Tokyo Electric Power and Chubu Electric Power) became an equity holder and ReNew doubled its capacity for the third year. In 2018, ReNew Power acquired Ostro Energy and  Canadian pension fund CPPIB became an equity investor. The company also signed MoUs with the states of Andhra Pradesh and Maharashtra for investments in renewable energy sector.

In 2019, ReNew Power became the first company in India to partner with Korean company GSE&C in renewable energy, jointly developing the SECI-4 project in Rajasthan. ReNew raised US$450 million through dollar bonds to retire some existing debt. In July 2020, ReNew Power announced that it will manufacture solar cells and modules in India for 2 GW capacity.

During the COVID-19 pandemic, ReNew Power agreed to donate Rs. 20 Crores for mitigation.

On February 24, 2021, ReNew Power announced that it would go public through its merger with a SPAC called RMG Acquisition Corporation II. The merged company will be ReNew Energy Global PLC and listed on NASDAQ. ReNew was listed on the NASDAQ on 24 August 2021 under the symbol "RNW". The value of the transaction is around $8 billion.

In August 2021, ReNew Power announced an acquisition plan for 99 MW hydroelectric power plant from L&T.

Project locations
ReNew Power has a portfolio of more than 10,214 megawatts (MW) located in eight states of India.

Awards
Awards won by ReNew Power include the ET Process Innovation Award, 2019, the Champion of Tomorrow at CEO Award 2018, Corporate Social Responsibility Award at FICCI CSR Awards 2018,  Outstanding Start up at Forbes India Leadership Award 2017, innovation award in EHS by CII. In 2020, it was named as S&P Platts Global Rising Star Company of the Year.

See also
 Astonfield
 Solar Energy Corporation of India
 Solar power in India

References

External links

Solar energy companies of India
Wind power companies of India
Engineering companies of India
Companies based in Gurgaon
Renewable resource companies established in 2011
Indian companies established in 2011
Indian brands
2011 establishments in Haryana
Companies listed on the Nasdaq
2021 initial public offerings